The Jabuka–Andrija Fault is a seismically active thrust fault under the Adriatic Sea in Croatia. A 2003 series of earthquakes near Jabuka island, the strongest reaching a magnitude of 5.5, was caused by movements along the Jabuka–Andrija Fault.

See also 
 Jabuka (island)
 Svetac, an island also known as Sveti Andrija

References

Geology of Croatia
Seismic faults of Europe